Constantin Antonescu (19 March 1923 – 2008) was a Romanian sports shooter. He competed at the 1956 Summer Olympics and the 1960 Summer Olympics.

References

1923 births
1968 deaths
Romanian male sport shooters
Olympic shooters of Romania
Shooters at the 1956 Summer Olympics
Shooters at the 1960 Summer Olympics
Sportspeople from Constanța
20th-century Romanian people